Short Mountain lies along the northwestern margin of Massanutten Mountain in Shenandoah County, Virginia.  It is seven miles in length, from Mount Jackson on the south end to Edinburg on the north, so it was also once known as "Seven-Mile Mountain".  The Massanutten Trail traverses the mountain.

References 

Mountains of Shenandoah County, Virginia
Mountains of Virginia